Phool Bahadur is a novel in Magahi language by Indian author Jainath Pati that was published in 1928 and was the first novel written in Magahi Language. It was a Comic novel and was published on first of April on April Fools' Day.

References

External links 

 Phool Bahadur full text

1928 books
Magahi language
20th-century Indian novels